1-Butyl-3-methylimidazolium tetrachloroferrate is a magnetic ionic liquid. It can be obtained from 1-butyl-3-methylimidazolium chloride and ferric chloride. It has quite low water solubility.

Due to the presence of the high spin FeCl4 anion, the liquid is paramagnetic and a magnetic susceptibility of 40.6 × 10−6 emu g−1 is reported. A simple small neodymium magnet suffices to attract the liquid in a test tube.

References 

Magnetism
Ionic liquids
Imidazolium compounds
ferrates
Iron(III) compounds
Iron_complexes
Chlorometallates